Suuret suomalaiset (Great Finns) was a 2004 television show broadcast in Finland by Yle (the Finnish Broadcasting Company), which determined the 100 greatest Finns of all time according to the opinions of its viewers. The viewers were able to vote during a programme which lasted from October to December 2004. The show was a Finnish spin-off of the BBC's programme Great Britons.

The list

The winner
During the final stage of voting, people had the chance to vote for the following three leading candidates: Risto Ryti, C.G.E. Mannerheim and Urho Kekkonen. The winner was baron Carl Gustaf Emil Mannerheim, a war hero, Marshal of Finland, and president.

Top Ten
C.G.E. Mannerheim (1867–1951) (President of Finland, 1944–1946, and Marshal of Finland)
Risto Ryti (1889–1956) (President of Finland, 1940–1944)
Urho Kekkonen (1900–1986) (President of Finland, 1956–1981)
Adolf Ehrnrooth (1905–2004) (infantry general, a figurehead for the Finnish veteran community)
Tarja Halonen (1943–) (First female President of Finland, 2000–2012 )
Arvo Ylppö (1887–1992) (famed paediatrician)
Mikael Agricola (1510–1557) (Protestant reformer and creator of literary Finnish language)
Jean Sibelius (1865–1957) (world-famous composer of romantic music)
Aleksis Kivi (1834–1872) (national author)
Elias Lönnrot (1802–1884) (anthropologist)

Facetious voting and speculation on manipulated results
Everybody in the top ten can be regarded as "serious" candidates, but right after those first ten are a number of candidates that have probably been selected in a more humorous sense. Positions 11–14 are held by:
 Position 11, Matti Nykänen (1963–2019)  – A four-time Olympic gold medalist who is also known for his later ill-fated careers as a singer and a stripper. He is a person loved dearly by the Finnish sensationalist press.
 Position 12, Väinö Myllyrinne (1909–1963)  – The tallest Finnish person ever. In the Finnish language, the words "great", "tall" and "big" can all be expressed with the word "suuri", which is used in the name of the program. Thus, voting for Myllyrinne was a kind of joke.
 Position 13, Ville Valo (1976–) – The vocalist of the famous Finnish alternative rock band HIM.
 Position 14, Lalli – A mythical and possibly apocryphal figure who, according to a medieval legend, killed Bishop Henry in Finland in 1156.

After the results were published, much speculation started on the issue of whether Yle had manipulated the results to keep facetious candidates out of the top ten. Yle has condemned the accusations but has refused to publish the number of votes that candidates below top ten received.

The person most conspicuously not appearing on the list is the international diplomat and former President of Finland Martti Ahtisaari, who has been a perennial favourite in Finland for the Nobel Peace Prize, and was finally awarded it in 2008.

Advocates
In broadcast order:
Jari Tervo, (1959–) author, humorist and TV personality from the show Uutisvuoto (Have I Got News For You); for Arvo Ylppö
Paula Lehtomäki, (1972–) current Minister for Foreign Trade and Development (Kesk.); for Urho Kekkonen
Pirkko Saisio, (1949–) Finlandia-winning author; for Mikael Agricola
Kaari Utrio, (1942–) author and feminist; for Tarja Halonen
Jukka Virtanen, author, director and actor; for Aleksis Kivi
Lasse Lehtinen, (1947–) author, Member of the European Parliament (PES); for Risto Ryti
Sari Kaasinen, musician in the traditional music band Värttinä; for Elias Lönnrot
Arto Nyberg, (1966–) journalist, TV personality, host of the talk show Arto Nyberg; for Adolf Ehrnrooth
Pekka Kuusisto, (1976–) musician, composer, prize-winning violin player; for Jean Sibelius
Riitta Uosukainen, (1942–) veteran politician (Kok.), first female Speaker of the Parliament of Finland; for C. G. E. Mannerheim

Other editions

Other countries have produced similar shows; see Greatest Britons spin-offs

References

External links
Suuret suomalaiset

Greatest Nationals
2004 Finnish television series debuts
2004 Finnish television series endings
Finnish television shows
Finnish television series based on British television series
Lists of Finnish people
Yle original programming